Across the Rhine (known in Europe as 1944: Across the Rhine) is a 1995 computer wargame developed by MPS Labs and published by MicroProse. The game was re-released digitally using DOSBox, supporting Windows, macOS, and Linux platforms.

Gameplay
Across the Rhine is a computer wargame with real-time gameplay. It simulates the clash between American and Nazi German forces during World War II.

Reception

In Computer Games Strategy Plus, Mike Robel found Across the Rhine a flawed but interest title, with a "very steep learning curve". Writing for Computer Game Review, Frank Snyder called the game' "an impressive tank simulator that will certainly appease strategy sim fans". The magazine's Tasos Kaiafas was less positive, largely panning the game.

References

External links

1995 video games
Computer wargames
DOS games
Linux games
MacOS games
Games commercially released with DOSBox
Real-time strategy video games
Video games developed in the United States
Windows games
World War II video games